Macropeza is a genus of flies belonging to the family Ceratopogonidae.

The species of this genus are found in Europe and Northern America.

Species:
 Macropeza abonnenci (Clastrier, 1958) 
 Macropeza aethiopica (Ingram & Macfie, 1923)

References

Ceratopogonidae